César Campodónico (1929–2005) was an Uruguayan actor.

People from Montevideo
1929 births
2005 deaths
Uruguayan male stage actors
Place of birth missing